Big Band is a 1997 album by the jazz saxophonist Joe Henderson, the fourth of the five albums he recorded with Verve Records at the end of his career. As the title suggests, it contains arrangements for a full big band.

Track listing
All tracks are composed by Joe Henderson, except where noted.
"Without a Song" (Vincent Youmans, Billy Rose, Edward Eliscu) – 5:24
"Isotope" – 5:20
"Inner Urge" – 9:01
"Black Narcissus" – 6:53
"A Shade Of Jade" – 8:22
"Step Lightly" – 7:19
"Serenity" – 5:52
"Chelsea Bridge" (Billy Strayhorn) – 4:30
"Recordame (Recuerdame)" – 7:25

Personnel
 Joe Henderson – tenor saxophone, arranger (tracks 1, 2, 5, 8)
 Slide Hampton – conductor, arranger (tracks 3, 7))
 Dick Oatts – soprano saxophone, alto saxophone
 Pete Yellin, Steve Wilson, Bobby Porcelli, John O'Gallagher – alto saxophone
 Craig Handy, Rich Perry, Tim Ries, Charles Pillow – tenor saxophone
 Joe Temperley, Gary Smulyan – baritone saxophone
 Freddie Hubbard (tracks 4-5), Raymond Vega, Idrees Sulieman, Jimmy Owens, Jon Faddis, Lew Soloff, Marcus Belgrave, Nicholas Payton (tracks 6, 9), Tony Kadleck, Michael Mossman, Virgil Jones, Earl Gardner, Byron Stripling – trumpet
 Conrad Herwig, Jimmy Knepper, Robin Eubanks, Keith O'Quinn, Larry Farrell, Kiane Zawadi – trombone
 David Taylor, Douglas Purviance – bass trombone
 Chick Corea (tracks 2-4, 6-7), Helio Alves (track 9), Ronnie Mathews (tracks 1, 5, 8) – piano
 Christian McBride – bass
 Joe Chambers, Al Foster, Lewis Nash, Paulinho Braga – drums
 Michael Mossman – arranger (track 9)
 Bob Belden – arranger (tracks: 4, 6))
 Richard Seidel, Don Sickler – producers

References

1996 albums
Joe Henderson albums
Verve Records albums
Grammy Award for Best Large Jazz Ensemble Album